Elizabeth Greene may refer to:

 Liz Greene (born 1946), American-British astrologer, psychologist, and author
 Elizabeth Greene (alpine skier) (born 1941), Canadian former alpine skier
 Elizabeth Plunket Greene (1899–1978), English crime novelist

See also 
 Elizabeth Green (disambiguation)